Sipsey Creek is a stream in the U.S. state of Mississippi. It is a tributary to Tuscolameta Creek.

Sipsey is a name derived from the Choctaw language meaning "poplar tree". A variant name is "Turkey Creek".

References

Rivers of Mississippi
Rivers of Neshoba County, Mississippi
Rivers of Newton County, Mississippi
Rivers of Scott County, Mississippi
Mississippi placenames of Native American origin